Creighton Elementary School District is a K–8 school district based in Phoenix, Arizona, United States.

Founded in 1884, the boundaries of Creighton Elementary School District lie within East-Central Phoenix.  Its main office is located at 2702 East Flower Street, Phoenix, AZ  85016.

As of 2012, most of the students speak Spanish and come from low-income households. There is a high crime level in areas of the district.

In 2013 the Creighton Community Foundation was created to support the community served by the district. The foundation's office is located on the campus of The Larry C Kennedy Elementary School.

Schools
 Biltmore Preparatory Academy
 Creighton Elementary School
 Excelencia Elementary School
 Gateway Elementary School
 Larry C. Kennedy Elementary School
 Loma Linda Elementary School
 William T. Machan Elementary School
 Monte Vista Elementary School
 Papago Elementary School

Biltmore Preparatory Academy
Biltmore Preparatory Academy is part of the Creighton Elementary School District. The campus is located at 4601 N. 34th Street, Phoenix, Arizona, United States. The school was previously known as Squaw Peak Traditional Academy. The name was changed to Biltmore Preparatory Academy in 2011. A remodel project was started during the 2018 school year and completed the summer of 2019. The primary focus of the remodel was the middle school section and the parking lot.

Spanish Language Immersion

Biltmore Preparatory Academy offers a Spanish language immersion program for its students. Students learn math and science in Spanish. The balance of their day is in English.

Preschools
There are two preschools on campus.  Covenant Child Care Center and Little Big Minds offer preschool and aftercare programs.  Little Big Minds is a Spanish language immersion preschool.

Gateway Elementary School

Gateway Elementary School is part of the Creighton Elementary School District.  The campus is located at 1100 North 35th Street. Phoenix, Arizona, United States. Gateway's enrollment is 850 students.  The school is a Reading First school, and hosts a 21st Century Community Learning Center.

Sports 
 Boys basketball
 Girls basketball
 Boys football
 Girls volleyball
 Girls cheerleading
 Girls softball

References

External links
 Creighton Elementary School District Website
 Arizona Department of Education district report card for 2006-2007
 Creighton Community Foundation
 Biltmore Preparatory Academy PTO

School districts in Phoenix, Arizona
School districts established in 1884
1884 establishments in Arizona Territory